Polish Seria A Volleyball League means

 Polish Volleyball League (men's league)
 Polish Seria A Women's Volleyball League